Corus Entertainment Inc. is a Canadian mass media company. The company was founded in 1987 as Shaw Radio, Ltd. as a subsidiary of Shaw Communications and was spun-off from Shaw in 1999. It has prominent holdings in the radio, publishing, and television industries. Corus is headquartered at Corus Quay in Toronto, Ontario. 

Corus has a large presence in Canadian broadcasting as owner of the national Global network (15 conventional stations), 39 radio stations, and a portfolio of 33 specialty television services; the company's domestic specialty brands include Showcase, SériesPlus, Slice, Teletoon, Télétoon, W Network, and YTV. It also operates services under brand licensing agreements with A&E Networks (History and Lifetime), Paramount Global (CMT and Nickelodeon), Walt Disney Television (including its Disney Branded Television, Freeform via ABC Spark, and National Geographic units), and Warner Bros. Discovery (Cartoon Network, Adult Swim, and lifestyle brands). 

Corus owns the animation studio Nelvana, animation software vendor Toon Boom Animation, and as well as the children's publisher Kids Can Press. The second incarnation of Shaw's media division—formed from the properties of the bankrupt Canwest Global—was subsumed by Corus on April 1, 2016, giving it control of the over-the-air Global network and 19 additional specialty channels. In May 2019, Shaw announced that it would sell its shares in Corus for roughly $500 million.

History

Origins 

Shaw Communications, founded in 1966, has entered a foray into conventional broadcasting. Founded by JR Shaw as Shaw Radio on August 27, 1987, it acquired two Red Deer radio stations, CIZZ-FM and CKGY-FM. Further acquisitions by Shaw during this period included CISN-FM Edmonton (1988), CHAY-FM Barrie (1990), CKCK-FM Woodstock (1991), and CFOX-FM and CKLG-AM Vancouver (1992). 

The company in 1995 had acquired CUC Broadcasting's 34% stake of YTV. Shaw acquired Rogers' remaining shares of YTV in 1998.

Establishment
In September 1998, JR Shaw and Shaw Media CEO John Cassaday announced plans for Shaw Communications to spin out its media properties, including radio stations and television specialty channels, into a company which would be known as Corus Entertainment. The spin-out would leave Shaw as a "pure play" telecommunications company. The decision to spin out the properties was meant to comply with current Canadian Radio-television and Telecommunications Commission (CRTC) recommendations, which discouraged vertical integration by cable companies that also owned media properties. Corus would be a separate, publicly traded company, first listed on the Toronto Stock Exchange in September 1999, but it would still be primarily controlled by the Shaw family.

In September 1999, Corus acquired the broadcasting assets of the Power Corporation of Canada, which included four television stations and sixteen radio stations. One of these stations, CHAU-TV, was later re-sold to Télé Inter-Rives. In October 1999, it was announced that as part of the break-up of Western International Communications (WIC), Corus would acquire the company's 12 radio stations and most of its specialty channels, including stakes in Family Channel, SuperChannel and MovieMax!.

Growth, acquisitions 
In September 2000, after negotiations and rumoured offers by other studios, Corus announced that it would acquire the Toronto-based animation studio Nelvana for $540 million; the deal was considered to be a complement to its children's television networks (which had often acquired programming from Nelvana), including YTV, Treehouse, and its stakes in Family Channel, Teletoon, and its French counterpart Télétoon. Corus also stated that it planned to use the purchase to help launch a preschool-oriented cable network in the U.S.

In March 2001, in response to complaints by the CRTC over its near-monopoly on ownership of children's specialty channels in Canada, Corus sold its stake in Family Channel to Astral Media for $126.9 million, making it a sister channel to The Movie Network and giving them full ownership. Corus also sold its stake in the Western Canadian pay-per-view service Viewers Choice to Shaw Communications for $22.6 million, and acquired the Women's Television Network (WTN) from Shaw (which had bought its parent, Moffat Communications, for its cablesystem assets) for $132.6 million. In August 2002, Corus sold CKDO and CKGE-FM to Durham Radio.

In May 2002, Corus announced that it had acquired a 50% stake in Locomotion, a Latin American Spanish-language channel focusing primarily of animated television series targeting teens and young adults. Hearst Corporation owned the other half.

In March 2004, Corus and Astral announced that it would acquire and swap radio stations in Quebec; Corus acquired the Radiomédia network (including CKAC) and Quebec City's CFOM, while Astral acquired CFVM-FM Amqui, CJOI-FM and CIKI-FM Rimouski, CFZZ-FM Saint-Jean-sur-Richelieu, and CJDM-FM Drummondville. Corus also sold its Red Deer, Alberta stations CKGY-FM and CIZZ-FM to Newcap Radio.

In July 2007, Corus acquired CKBT-FM and CJZZ-FM from Canwest. In June 2008, CHRC was sold to the ownership group of the Quebec Remparts hockey team.

Additional partnerships, Corus Québec sale 
Also in August 2007, Corus Entertainment announced a partnership with Hearst Corporation to launch Cosmopolitan TV. In March 2008, CTVglobemedia sold Canadian Learning Television to Corus for $73 million

Corus launched a Canadian version of Nickelodeon on November 2, 2009, replacing the localized version of Discovery Kids. In 2010, Corus's sister company Shaw Communications re-entered the broadcasting industry through its acquisition of the media assets of the bankrupt Canwest, which re-formed the Shaw Media division.

On April 30, 2010, Corus announced that it would sell its Québec radio stations, with the exception of CKRS, to Cogeco for $80 million, pending CRTC approval. Corus cited their low profitability in comparison to their stations elsewhere as reasoning for the sale. On June 25, it was reported that Corus had agreed to sell CKRS to Radio Saguenay, a local business group. The sale of the Corus Québec stations was approved by the CRTC on December 17, 2010, on the condition that Cogeco-owned CJEC-FM and Corus-owned CFEL-FM and CKOY-FM be sold to another party by December 2011. On January 13, 2011, competing broadcaster Astral Media announced that they would seek legal action to stop the sale of these stations to Cogeco, citing the fact that it would own more stations than Astral in the Montreal market, making the competition unfair.

On November 9, 2010, Hasbro Studios signed an agreement with Corus to broadcast their productions on its networks.

In March 2012, Corus and Shaw launched ABC Spark, a localized version of U.S. cable network ABC Family, with Shaw owning 49%. In July 2012, the Teletoon Canada venture (50% with Astral Media) similarly launched a Canadian version of Cartoon Network and Adult Swim.

Re-organization 
In March 2013, as part of Bell Media's proposed acquisition of Astral Media, Corus reached a deal to acquire Astral's stakes in Historia, Séries+, and TELETOON Canada Inc., as well as the Ottawa radio stations CJOT-FM and CKQB-FM, for $400.6 million. This aspect of the deal, intended to quell concerns from the CRTC regarding Bell's total market share after the merger, was approved by the Competition Bureau on March 18, 2013. In an unrelated deal, Corus also announced that it would acquire Shaw Media's stakes in ABC Spark, Historia, and Séries+ in exchange for cash and its minority stake in Food Network Canada (quickly ended in April 2013). Corus indicated that these purchases were meant to help the company expand its television holdings in the competitive Quebec market. Corus also planned to open a new office in Montreal following the sale. On January 1, 2014, the acquisition was completed.

On September 1, 2013, Corus's television business was reorganized into five divisions; Corus Kids, Corus Women and Family, Corus Content Distribution and Pay TV, Corus Airtime Sales and Corus Média (for French-language assets). The Corus Kids division was subdivided into operations for their eight TV channels, Nelvana, and Kids Can Press.

Acquisition of Disney Channel program rights 
On April 16, 2015, Corus Entertainment announced that it had reached an agreement with the Disney–ABC Television Group to acquire long-term, Canadian multi-platform rights to distribute Disney Channel's programming library and associated brands. As a result, Canadian versions of Disney Channel in both languages: English and French. Launched on September 1, 2015. Further re-alignment occurred the same day, with the discontinuation of the Teletoon Retro brand: the English version assumed the intellectual property of Cartoon Network (which widened its carriage), and the French version being replaced by the aforementioned Disney La Chaîne. New Corus-run Disney Junior and Disney XD services launched as well, on December 1, 2015. Before that, the existing versions owned by DHX Media were respectively rebranded to Family Jr. and Family CHRGD (the latter now WildBrainTV), spinoffs of Family, and they lost the rights to broadcast Disney content in Canada.

Shutdown of Movie Central and Encore Avenue 
On November 20, 2015, Corus announced, as a result of a strategic review, it would shut down its premium Movie Central and Encore Avenue services on March 1, 2016 in order to focus more on its national specialty channels. Subscribers to the networks were migrated to Bell Media's The Movie Network and TMN Encore—ending the regional monopolies that TMN and Movie Central held in eastern and western Canada respectively. Bell Media made a payment of $211 million to Corus for assistance in coordinating this migration. Bell also announced that it would acquire Corus' stake in HBO Canada, giving them full ownership.

Acquisition of Shaw Media 
On January 13, 2016, Corus Entertainment announced that it would acquire Shaw Media for $2.65 billion, with Shaw Communications taking a 39% share of Corus stock. The division consisted primarily of the broadcasting assets of the former Canwest, including the over-the-air Global Television Network and 19 other specialty channels, such as Food Network, HGTV, Showcase, History, and Slice. The transaction was being used to fund Shaw Communications' purchase of wireless carrier Wind Mobile. Corus' CEO, Doug Murphy, described the transaction as being a "transformational acquisition that redefines Corus and Canada's media landscape".

As the Shaw family's assets are considered a single entity for regulatory purposes by the CRTC, the CRTC officially considered the acquisition to be a reorganization of their assets, and thus exempted it from its concentration of media ownership and tangible benefits rules. The reorganization was approved on March 23, 2016, and completed on April 1, 2016. At the same time, multiple Shaw Media executives joined Corus (including its former CEO Barbara Williams, as its new executive VP and COO), and the company adopted a new logo.

Attempted sale of French-language channels 
On October 17, 2017, Bell Media announced its intent to acquire Historia and Séries+ from Corus for $200 million, which would have reunited them with the former Astral Media channels Canal D, Canal Vie, Vrak, and Z. Corus stated that the two channels were not part of its "strategic priorities" at this time. On May 28, 2018, the sale was blocked and rejected by the Competition Bureau, for violating conditions imposed on Bell that prohibits the company from regaining ownership of divested Astral properties for 10 years.

Expanded partnerships, sale of Shaw Communications share 
On June 13, 2018, The Globe and Mail reported that the Shaw family was exploring the sale of its shares in Corus, in order to fund future expansion of the Freedom Mobile business. In its third-quarter financial report, Corus reported a year-over-year loss of $91 million, in comparison to a profit of $133 million in 2017. Corus also took a $1.013 billion write-down on its broadcasting businesses, resulting in a quarterly loss of $935.9 million, and cut its dividend to 24 cents. Doug Murphy acknowledged changes to the market climate for television, and stated that the company would have a larger focus on automated and "microtargeted" advertising sales going forward (in particular, using artificial intelligence to analyze information from set-top boxes to determine the best advertising strategies).

On March 4, 2019, it was announced that a full-time Canadian version of Adult Swim would be launched. The block was shut down on that same day, and relaunched as 24-hour channel on April 1, 2019, replacing the declining channel Action under its existing license.

In May 2019, Shaw announced it would sell its shares in Corus in a secondary offering, at a valuation of $548 million. The sale was expected to be completed by the end of the month.

In June 2019, Corus was announced as a launch partner for Amazon Prime Video Channels in Canada, offering a subscription-based bundle known as StackTV with access to live and on-demand programs from five Global TV stations and eleven Corus specialty services. At the same time, Corus would also launch a separate Nickelodeon SVOD channel known as Nick+.

In July 2019, multiple service providers began notifying their customers that two of Corus' declining specialty channels, IFC Canada and CosmoTV, would cease operations on September 30, 2019. In October 2019, FYI announced that it would shutter as well on December 31, 2019.

In March 2020, Corus replaced the individual mobile apps for most of its specialty channels with a unified app under the Global brand, featuring content from Global, Global News, Food Network, HGTV, History, Showcase, Slice, and W Network on-launch. The app encompasses the TV Everywhere streaming of programming from the networks for their subscribers, as well as free ad-supported streaming of selected programs from the networks without a television subscription. 

In June and July 2020, Corus reached two content agreements with subsidiaries of Comcast, including Canadian rights to original series produced for its U.S. streaming service Peacock (NBCUniversal) on June 23, 2020, and Canadian rights to original productions from British subsidiary Sky Studios via NBCUniversal Global Distribution (the agreements exclude DreamWorks Animation's television subsidiary, which has a pre-existing output agreement with WildBrain).

BBC Canada was shut down on December 31, 2020; Blue Ant Media would launch a spiritual successor, BBC First, in March 2021. In October 2021, Corus partnered with Discovery Inc. on Canadian marketing for its Discovery+ streaming service. DIY Network was rebranded to a Canadian version of Magnolia Network on March 28, 2022. In September 2022, Nick+ was shut down and replaced by Teletoon+, which is drawn from the Cartoon Network Studios and Warner Bros. Animation libraries. In December 2022, Corus partnered with Paramount Global on launching its free ad-supported streaming television (FAST) service Pluto TV in Canada, with Corus handling Canadian marketing, advertising sales, and contributing channels featuring content from its library and Global News.

On February 21, 2023, Corus announced that Teletoon would be rebranded as Cartoon Network on March 27, 2023 (ending the brand's presence on linear television after over 25 years of operation), and that the existing Cartoon Network channel would be relaunched as the first Canadian version of its sister brand Boomerang.

Corporate governance 
The company's current CEO is Doug Murphy. Until 2003, the CEO post was filled by John Cassaday.

Sponsorships and industry partnerships 
Corus is an industry sponsor of the University of Waterloo Stratford Campus; Gary Maavara, Corus' Corporate Secretary, sits on the Waterloo campus' advisory board. The company also funds a couple of endowed chair positions, including chair in Women in Management at the Ivey Business School (London, Ontario, Canada) beginning in 2003, and a chair in Communications Strategy at the Rotman School of Management (Toronto) beginning in 2002.

Relationship with Shaw Communications 
Corus Entertainment was formed from the media assets that had been owned by Shaw Communications in the years before. Shaw and Corus are independent, publicly traded companies, but nonetheless, some reports indicate that the two companies continued to have a close relationship. For several years, Corus managed advertising operations (such as TV listings channels) for Shaw's cable systems, although this operation has since been discontinued. Executives have also occasionally moved between the two companies, with former Corus Television president Paul Robertson joining Shaw to head Shaw Media (the former Canwest broadcasting operations) in 2010.

Following Shaw's 2010 acquisition of Canwest's TV assets, the two companies incidentally became partners in certain channels including Dusk (later replaced by ABC Spark) and the Canadian version of Food Network; these two partnerships were unwound in April 2013. Otherwise, there was no connection or common programming between Corus's conventional and specialty television operations and those of Shaw Media. For example, Corus owns three over-the-air TV stations which were longtime CBC affiliates, and which agreed in 2015 to switch to Bell Media's CTV network, despite Shaw owning the rival Global network at the time. Following the merger of the Shaw Media properties into Corus, the Corus-operated CTV affiliates began transitioning to Global programming in September 2016 (beginning with CTV News programming being phased out in favour of Global News), and eventually switching to Global full-time after their affiliation expired on August 27, 2018.

As Corus Entertainment and Shaw Communications are both effectively controlled by JR Shaw, the CRTC considers them to be one entity regarding the "Diversity of Voices" policy and a vertical integration rule which requires television providers to carry three channels owned by unaffiliated parties for each co-owned channel they offer: due to the effective control, Corus networks that are carried by Shaw television services are subject to this rule.

See also 
 List of assets owned by Corus Entertainment
 List of Canadian television channels
 List of Canadian specialty channels
 StackTV
 RiverTV
 List of conglomerates
 Media of Canada
 Bell Media
 Rogers Sports & Media
 WildBrain
 Blue Ant Media
 Canadian Broadcasting Corporation

References

External links 

 
Corus Entertainment Inc. - Canadian Communications Foundation

 
Canadian brands
Corporate spin-offs
Companies listed on the Toronto Stock Exchange
Mass media companies established in 1999
Companies based in Toronto
Conglomerate companies of Canada
Conglomerate companies established in 1999
Publishing companies established in 1999
1987 establishments in Alberta
1999 establishments in Ontario
Television broadcasting companies of Canada
Canadian companies established in 1987
Canadian companies established in 1999